Shokhista Khojasheva (born 3 February 1995) is a Kazakhstani women's football defender, who plays in the Turkish Women's Super League for Trabzonspor with jersey number 5. She is part of the Kazakhstan women's national football team.

Club career 
Khojasheva was a member of Okzhetpes Kokshetau in her country.

She joined Hakkarigücü Spor in southeastern Turkey on 17 October 2018 to play in the Turkish Women's First Football League. On 27 October 2020, she left Turkey and returned to Kazakhstan. By April 2021, she returned to Turkey to play for her former team Hakkarigücü in the 2020–21 Turkcell Women's League.  In the |2022–23 Turkish Women's Super League season, she transferred to Trabzonspor
.

International career 
Khojasheva was part of the Kazakhstan women's national football team, and played in five matches of the 2019 FIFA Women's World Cup qualification.

Career statistics 
.

References

External links 

1995 births
Living people
Kazakhstani women's footballers
Women's association football defenders
Kazakhstan women's international footballers
Kazakhstani expatriate footballers
Kazakhstani expatriate sportspeople in Turkey
Expatriate women's footballers in Turkey
Hakkarigücü Spor players
Turkish Women's Football Super League players
Trabzonspor women's players